The 2014 Israeli Basketball League Cup was the 9th edition of the Israeli Basketball League Cup pre-season tournament. Hapoel Jerusalem won its third League Cup title.

Bracket

2014
League Cup